Datin Wong Mew Choo (born 1 May 1983) is a Malaysian former badminton singles player. She was known for her exceptional stamina and endurance. Without any significant attacking weapons, she initially built her game on her ability to endure long rallies, sending the shuttle continually back against more powerful players. These tactics served her well, but put a lot of pressure on her knees and ankles. She suffered from various long term injuries during her playing career.

Career 
She first came to prominence in the 2003 Southeast Asian Games badminton women's singles, when she won the gold medal, along the way beating Singapore's Li Li, then the reigning Commonwealth Games Champion.

2005 
She competed at the 2005 World Championships in Anaheim and reached the second round. She managed two quarterfinal appearances, in the Denmark Open and 2005 Asian Championships.

She managed to reach the semifinal of Indonesia Open, losing a tough encounter with Mia Audina. Later that year, she qualified again for the 2005 Southeast Asian Games women's singles badminton final, but had to settle for silver, losing to Adriyanti Firdasari of Indonesia.

2006 
In the XVIII Commonwealth Games in Melbourne, she helped Malaysia clinch the gold medal in the mixed team event, taking the crucial point against England's Tracey Hallam that gave Malaysia the lead 2–1. Eventually the team won 3–1 over England for the first time in Games history. However, Hallam exacted revenge in the individual events women's singles final.

In the World Championships, she reached the third round before losing to Zhang Ning.

Her best achievement of the year was in the Korea Open semifinals, losing to eventual winner Zhu Lin. She also reached the China Open quarterfinals.

2007 
The year 2007 was Wong's best year. She started by reaching the finals of the Malaysia Superseries, defeating big names like Pi Hongyan and Xu Huaiwen on her way. At the All England Superseries, she beat Chinese Lu Lan to become the first Malaysian women's singles player to qualify in the women's singles quarterfinal. Lu claimed revenge in the 2007 Asian Championships.

Her biggest win was at the 2007 BWF World Championships third round, where she shocked China's Xie Xingfang in straight sets to become the first Malaysian women's singles player to reach the quarter-finals of the World Championships in Kuala Lumpur. However, her progress was stopped by Zhu Lin, who went on to take the title.

She was beaten in the first round of the Denmark Superseries, but quickly rebounded a week later, at the French Superseries. Wong defeated higher ranked players like Wang Chen. However, Wong lost to Xie Xingfang in the semifinal.

Wong, who is unseeded at the China Open Superseries and has not won any major championship since the 2003 Southeast Asian Games, delivered a brilliant performance in Guangzhou, China by beating all the top three female shuttlers from China in succession, starting with world champion Zhu Lin, two-time Olympic Champion Zhang Ning, and finally world number one Xie Xingfang in three sets in the final. She became the one of only a few non-Chinese (overseas Chinese) winners of the China Open. She also became the first Malaysian woman to lift an international title outside the country.

2008 
Wong started the year by reaching the semifinal of Malaysia Superseries before losing to Zhu Lin once again.

She played in the Beijing 2008 Olympic Games, becoming the quarter-finalist after her defeat from Lu Lan of China.

2009 
Getting injured at the beginning of this season, Wong returned in Swiss Open Superseries and India Open. But her achievements were not yet satisfactory.

She was also chosen as the Malaysia's top women's singles player to play in Sudirman Cup. In the semi-finals, her team lost 0–3 to China.

In the China Open Superseries in November, Wong humbled China's Wang Yihan, the world number one, in two sets, 21–18 and 21–17. However, she was beaten by Wang's compatriot Wang Shixian in the quarter-finals.

In December, Wong clinched her first title of the year in World Superseries Masters Finals - downing Juliane Schenk, 21–15, 21–7. Many top players did not play in women's singles of Superseries Finals, allowing Wong, who was ranked 20th in Superseries rankings at that time, to participate.

Wong led Malaysia women's team in 2009 Southeast Asian Games in Laos. She and her teammates won the gold medal by beating Indonesia 3–1. However, Wong failed to reach individual final as she was defeated by Thailand's Salakjit Ponsana 18–21, 14–21. As a result, Wong only claimed bronze.

In 2010 Commonwealth Games, Delhi, she won silver in a closely contested final with Saina Nehwal of India, ranked No 3 in the world.

2011 
In April, Wong has retired from competition, citing injuries that have taken a toll on her body. Due to her experience and service to the national team, BJSS offered her a coaching contract to become one of the women coaches.

Achievements

Commonwealth Games 
Women's singles

Asian Championships 
Women's singles

Southeast Asian Games 
Women's singles

BWF Superseries 
The BWF Superseries, launched on 14 December 2006 and implemented in 2007, is a series of elite badminton tournaments, sanctioned by Badminton World Federation (BWF). BWF Superseries has two level such as Superseries and Superseries Premier. A season of Superseries features twelve tournaments around the world, which introduced since 2011, with successful players invited to the Superseries Finals held at the year end.

Women's singles

  BWF Superseries Finals tournament
  BWF Superseries tournament

BWF Grand Prix 
The BWF Grand Prix has two levels: Grand Prix and Grand Prix Gold. It is a series of badminton tournaments, sanctioned by Badminton World Federation (BWF) since 2007. The World Badminton Grand Prix sanctioned by International Badminton Federation (IBF) since 1983.

Women's singles

Career Overview

Record against selected opponents 
Record against year-end Finals finalists, World Championships semi-finalists, and Olympic quarter-finalists.

Personal life 
She has an elder sister, Wong Miew Kheng who was a former Malaysian national badminton player. She also dated the Malaysian badminton star Lee Chong Wei. The duo were planning to settle down after 11 years of courtship, after the London Olympics.

In year 2009, Lee and Wong announced they are no longer together during the 2009 World Championships in Hyderabad, India. However, Lee Chong Wei announced his reconciliation with Mew Choo after winning a silver medal in 2012 London Olympics. They met in 2001 at a public badminton camp when they were both back-up shuttlers for the Malaysian crew. They got married on 9 November 2012. The couple had their first child, Kingston on 12 April 2013 and their second child, Terrance on 9 July 2015.

References 

1983 births
Living people
People from Ipoh
Malaysian female badminton players
Malaysian people of Hakka descent
Hakka sportspeople
Malaysian sportspeople of Chinese descent
Badminton players at the 2008 Summer Olympics
Olympic badminton players of Malaysia
Badminton players at the 2006 Commonwealth Games
Badminton players at the 2010 Commonwealth Games
Commonwealth Games gold medallists for Malaysia
Commonwealth Games silver medallists for Malaysia
Commonwealth Games medallists in badminton
Badminton players at the 2002 Asian Games
Badminton players at the 2006 Asian Games
Badminton players at the 2010 Asian Games
Asian Games competitors for Malaysia
Competitors at the 2003 Southeast Asian Games
Competitors at the 2005 Southeast Asian Games
Competitors at the 2009 Southeast Asian Games
Southeast Asian Games gold medalists for Malaysia
Southeast Asian Games silver medalists for Malaysia
Southeast Asian Games bronze medalists for Malaysia
Southeast Asian Games medalists in badminton
Medallists at the 2006 Commonwealth Games
Medallists at the 2010 Commonwealth Games